Thomas McGuire (1920–1945) was an American fighter ace.

Thomas or Tom McGuire may also refer to:

Tom McGuire (baseball) (1892–1959), American baseball player
Tom McGuire (actor) (1873–1954), English film actor
Thomas McGuire (engineer), American engineer